Sós, Sos or Şoş (its literal meaning in the Hungarian language being salty) is a Hungarian surname. It may refer to:
Csaba Sós (born 1957), retired Hungarian swimmer
Károly Sós (1909–1991), Hungarian footballer and manager
Márkó Sós (born 1990), Hungarian football player
Rozalia Șoș (born 1947), former Romanian handball player
Vera T. Sós (born 1930), Hungarian mathematician

References

External links 

Hungarian-language surnames